This page lists candidates in New Zealand's 2005 general election, grouping them by the electorate that they contested. See also candidates by party and party lists.

General electorates

Aoraki



Banks Peninsula

Bay of Plenty

Christchurch Central

Christchurch East

Clevedon

Clutha-Southland

Coromandel

Dunedin North

Dunedin South

East Coast
open seat - incumbent Labour MP Janet Elsdon Mackey retired in 2005

East Coast Bays

Epsom

Hamilton East

Hamilton West

Helensville

Hutt South

Ilam

Invercargill
open seat - Sitting MP Mark Peck retired in 2005

Kaikoura
open seat - incumbent National MP Lynda Scott retired in 2005

Mana

Mangere

Manukau East

Manurewa

Maungakiekie

Mount Albert

Mount Roskill

Napier

Nelson

New Lynn

New Plymouth

North Shore

Northcote

Northland

Ohariu-Belmont

Otago

Otaki

Pakuranga

Palmerston North

Piako

Port Waikato

Rakaia

Rangitikei

Rimutaka

Rodney

Rongotai

Rotorua

Tamaki
Incumbent Clem Simich is standing down to contest Mangere

Taranaki-King Country

Taupo

Tauranga

Te Atatu

Tukituki

Waimakariri

Wairarapa
Incumbent Labour MP Georgina Beyer stood as a list only candidate in 2005

Waitakere

Wellington Central

West Coast-Tasman

Whanganui

Whangarei

Wigram

Māori electorates

Ikaroa-Rawhiti

Tainui

Tamaki Makaurau

Te Tai Hauauru

Te Tai Tokerau

Te Tai Tonga

Waiariki

External links 
 A list of candidates by electorate with photos
 A list of all candidates by electorate - from a national news website, this links to candidate biography pages on the parties' websites.

2005 New Zealand general election
Candidates 2005